Frederick Barnard may refer to:
Sir Frederick Augusta Barnard (1742–1830), George III's librarian
Fred Barnard (1846–1896), Victorian illustrator
Frederick A. P. Barnard (1809–1889), American scientist and educator